Chalmers may refer to:

People
 Chalmers (surname), people with the surname Chalmers
 Chalmers Tschappat, American football player

Places
 Chalmers, Indiana, a US town
 Port Chalmers, Dunedin, New Zealand
 Port Chalmers (New Zealand electorate), a former New Zealand parliamentary electorate 
 Chalmers Institute, a historic building in Holly Springs, Mississippi, USA.

Organizations
 Allis-Chalmers, a manufacturing company
 Chalmers Automobile, a former U.S. car company
 Chalmers University of Technology, Gothenburg, Sweden